

Celtic Britain 
The Iron Age (600 BC to 50 AD) – Celtic Britain commenced around the time of the Iron Age. In Celtic society male homosexuality was permissible and acceptable between free adult men. However, these homosexual activities were bound by the male dominated Celtic culture, and was not seen as an effeminate practice.
Diodorus Siculus the Sicilian historian (1st century BC) stated that, 'although Celtic women were beautiful, their men preferred to sleep with each other'. Siculus also noted that 'it was an insult if a guest refused an offer of sex from a Celtic man. They usually sleep on the ground on skins of wild animals and tumble about with a bedfellow on either side. And what is strangest of all is that, without any thought for a natural sense of modesty, they carelessly surrender their virginity to other man. Far from finding anything shameful in all this, they feel insulted if anyone refuses the favours they offer'.

1st century 
 The Roman conquest of Britain begins, creating Roman Britain. Roman society was to shape Britain for the next four centuries. In the three main cities of London, Colchester and Saint Albans as in all Roman settlements was patriarchal, and the freeborn male citizen possessed political liberty (libertas) and the right to rule both himself and his household (familia). "Virtue" (virtus) was seen as an active quality through which a man (vir) defined himself. The conquest mentality and "cult of virility" shaped same-sex relations. Roman men were free to enjoy sex with other males without a perceived loss of masculinity or social status, as long as they took the dominant or penetrative role. 
 Acceptable male partners included prostitutes, and entertainers, whose lifestyle placed them in the nebulous social realm of infamia, excluded from the normal protections accorded to a citizen even if they were technically free.
 Although Roman men in general seem to have preferred youths between the ages of 12 and 20 as sexual partners, freeborn male minors were off limits, though professional prostitutes and entertainers might remain sexually available well into adulthood.
 By the end of the first century, Londinium the city was dotted with lupanaria ('wolf dens' or public pleasure houses), fornices (brothels) and thermiae (hot baths).

2nd century 

 117 – Emperor Hadrian, ruled Britain from 117 to 138. Hadrian was not only a peacemaker, he was also the first leader of Rome to make it clear that he was in today's language what we would call gay. Many predecessors had taken male lovers, as was possible in Roman society. Hadrian was unique however in making his love "official" in a way that no other emperor had before him. Hadrian had an openly sexual relationship with a beautiful youth, Antinous. When Antinous drowned in AD 130, Hadrian made Antinous into a god, publicly commemorated him across the empire, created a city Antinopolis in his name and created a religious cult equivalent at the time to Christianity in his name.

3rd century 
 208 – The Roman Empire was ruled from Britain for a brief period in AD 208–211.

4th century 
 312 – Roman Empire began to accept Christianity with the first emperor to convert to Christianity, Emperor Constantine. Along with his bishops, monks and missionaries an endless loop of alternating permissiveness and homosexual censure in the Roman world began.
 Eusebius of Caesarea wrote that "Among the Gauls, the young men marry each other (gamountai) with complete freedom. In doing this, they do not incur any reproach or blame, since this is done according to custom amongst them."
 Temples devoted to the goddess Cybele are present in Britain, including sites that are now Catterick and Corbridge. Archeology in Catterick has located the remains of a Galla; one of a priesthood to Cybele who could be understood in today's language as being transgender.

5th century 
 410 – Following the departure of the Romans, Jutes, Angles, Frisians and Saxons arrived at different times and regions, bringing with them their indigenous sexual traditions. (Tacitus previously described North Germanic tribes punishing homosexuality by drowning the offender in a bog.) There was no specific mention of homosexuality in Anglo-Saxon law (which was in place during the Anglo-Saxon period in England, before the Norman conquest) until the seventh century.

6th century 
 Welsh King Maelgwn (Malgo) of Gwynedd ruled. Geoffrey of Monmouth in his pseudohistorical book History of the Kings of Britain described the king as one of the handsomest of men in Britain, a great scourge of tyrants, and a man of great strength, extraordinary munificence, and matchless valour, but addicted very much to the detestable vice of sodomy, by which he made himself abominable to God.
 597 – Christianity did not formally arrive in Britain until 597, when Augustine of Canterbury arrived in Britain to convert the Germanic Anglo Saxons (Jutes, Angles, Frisians and Saxons) to Christianity, thus confirming the prohibition of homosexuality, which was already punishable by death in Germanic societies.

8th century 
 797  – During the Carolingian Renaissance, Alcuin of York, an abbot affectionately known as David, wrote love poems to other monks in spite of numerous church laws condemning homosexuality. Historians agree that Alcuin at times "comes perilously close to communicating openly his same-sex desires", and this reflects the erotic subculture of the Carolingian monastic.

11th century 
 1050–1150  – Historian John Boswell called the High Middle Ages the time of the 'Triumph of Ganymede' and finds evidence for a "reappearance for the first time since the decline of Rome of "what might be called a gay subculture" between 1050 and 1150 which completely disappears by 1300.
 1056–1100 – William II of England inherited the throne on his father William the Conqueror's death in 1087. Described as red haired, muscular and stocky and a taste for the latest fashion (including shoes that curled up at the toe), he never married or produced heirs. William of Malmesbury, the foremost English historian of the 12th century. described the King as "being in lust with Ranulf Flambard". He described the men of court having flamboyant tunics, pointed shoes, and hair down their backs like whores. He said court was full of "sodimites" and that William's death while hunting was judgement for his sins. Sodomy at this time however related to any sexual practice outside of marriage, and therefore does not necessarily refer to homosexuality.

12th century 

 1102 – The Council of London (Roman Catholic church council of the church in England) took measures to encourage the English public to believe that homosexuality was sinful.

13th century 
 1290 – Publication of Fleta, first book to suggest a punishment for homosexuality in English law. The 'Fleta' required 'sodomites' to be punished by being buried alive, whilst the 'Britton' advocated burning. No evidence exists that the punishments were ever carried out.
 1297 – Edward II of England (1307–1337) and his favourite, his closest political and emotional ally and lover Piers Gaveston, met. At 16 years old, Edward thus began a history of conflict with the nobility, who repeatedly banished Gaveston, the Earl of Cornwall, until Edward was king and could keep him reinstated. Gaveston's abuse of that power led to dangerous tensions with the barons who helped run the country and resulted in Gaveston's capture and eventual execution. After his death in 1312, Edward "constantly had prayers said for [Gaveston's] soul; he spent a lot of money on Gaveston's tomb".

14th century 

 1315–1317 – King Edward II had Piers Gaveston's embalmed body buried, two and a half years after his death. Edward moved on with a growing infatuation with Roger d'Amory which can be tracked from the extensive list of gifts, grants, wardship and land. By 1317 Damory was the most important man at court and the King's 'favourite'. It is unknown whether Roger Damory was Edward II's lover.
 1320 – King Edward II formed a close relationship with another good looking favorite and aide, Hugh Despenser, who manoeuvred into the affections of King Edward, displacing Roger d'Amory. This came much to the dismay of the baronage as they saw him both taking their rightful places at court at best, and at worst being the new, worse Gaveston. By 1320 Despenser's greed was running free. He also supposedly vowed revenge on Roger Mortimer, because Mortimer's grandfather had killed his own grandfather. 
 1321 – Despenser had earned many enemies in every stratum of society, from King Edward's wife Queen Isabella in France, to the barons, to the common people. There was even a plot to kill Despenser by sticking his wax likeness with pins. 
 1326 – While Isabella was in France to negotiate between her husband and the French king, she formed a liaison with Roger Mortimer and began planning an invasion of England in September 1326. The majority of the nobility rallied to them throughout September and October, preferring to stand with them rather than King Edward and Despenser. Despenser fled west with the King, with a sizeable sum from the treasury, but the escape was unsuccessful. The King and Despenser were deserted by most of their followers, and were captured near Neath in mid-November. 
 1337 – King Edward II was placed in captivity and later forced to abdicate in favour of his son Edward III. The popular story that the king was then assassinated by having a red-hot poker thrust into his anus has no basis in accounts recorded by Edward's contemporaries. Despenser was brought to trial and was found guilty on many charges. He was sentenced to death and was dragged naked through the streets, for the crowd's mistreatment. He was made a spectacle, which included writing on his body biblical verses against the capital sins he was accused of. Then he was hanged as a mere commoner, yet released before asphyxiation killed him. In Froissart's account of his execution, Despenser was then tied firmly to a ladder and his genitals sliced off and burned while he was still conscious. His entrails were slowly pulled out; finally, his heart was cut out and thrown into a fire. Froissart (or, rather, Jean le Bel's chronicle, on which he relied) is the only source to mention castration; other contemporary accounts have Despenser hanged, drawn and quartered, which usually did not involve castration. 
 1395 – John Rykener, known also as Johannes Richer and Eleanor, a transvestite prostitute working mainly in London (near Cheapside), but also active in Oxford, was arrested for cross-dressing and interrogated.

16th century 

 1533 – King Henry VIII passed the Buggery Act 1533 making all male–male sexual activity punishable by death. Buggery related only to intercourse per anum by a man with a man or woman or intercourse per anum or per vaginum by either a man or a woman with an animal. Other forms of "unnatural intercourse" amounted to indecent assault or gross indecency, but did not constitute buggery. The lesser offence of "attempted buggery" was punished by two years of jail and often horrific time on the pillory.
 1541 – The Buggery Act 1533 only ran until the end of the parliament. The law was re-enacted three times, and then in 1541 it was enacted to continue in force "for ever".
 1543 – Henry VIII gives royal assent to the Laws in Wales Act 1542, extending the buggery law into Wales.
 1547 – King Edward VI's first Parliament repealed all felonies created in the last reign of King Henry VIII.
 1548 – The provisions of the Buggery Act 1533 were given new force, with minor amendments. The penalty for buggery remained death, but goods and lands were not forfeit, and the rights of wives and heirs were safeguarded.
 1553 – Mary Tudor ascends the English throne and repealed the Buggery Act 1533 during her brief reign of 1553–1558.
 1558 – Elizabeth I ascended the English throne and reinstated the sodomy laws of 1533 (not 1548), which were then given permanent force until 1828 when replaced with the Offences Against the Person Act 1828.
 1580 – King James VI of Scotland, King James I England had romantic relationships with three men: Esmé Stewart, Robert Carr and George Villiers, 1st Duke of Buckingham. In 1580 at 14 years old, King James I of England began a relationship with Franco-Scottish Lord Esmé Stewart, 1st Duke of Lennox. Lennox was a relative and 24 years senior to James, married and the father of 5 children. The influence Lennox his "favourite" had on politics, and the resentment at the wealth they acquired, became major political issues during his reign. Scottish nobles ousted Lennox by luring the young king to Ruthven Castle as a guest but then imprisoned him for ten months. The Presbyterian nobles forced King James to banish Lennox to France. Lennox and James remained in secret contact. Lennox remained in France. He died in Paris in 1583. William Schaw took Lennox's heart back to James in Scotland, since in life its true place had been with the King.

17th century 
 
 1682 – A same-sex marriage is annulled. Arabella Hunt had married "James Howard" two years earlier but the marriage was annulled on the ground that Howard was in fact Amy Poulter, a 'perfect woman in all her parts', and two women could not validly marry.
 1690 – King William III of England had several close, male associates, including two Dutch courtiers to whom he granted English titles: Hans Willem Bentinck became Earl of Portland and Arnold Joost van Keppel was created Earl of Albemarle. These relationships with male friends and his apparent lack of more than one female mistress led William's enemies to suggest that he might prefer homosexual relationships. Keppel was 20 years William's junior, described as strikingly handsome, and rose from being a royal page to an earldom with some ease.
 1697 – William Bentinck, 1st Earl of Portland wrote to King William III that "the kindness which your Majesty has for a young man, and the way in which you seem to authorise his liberties ... make the world say things I am ashamed to hear". This, he said, was "tarnishing a reputation which has never before been subject to such accusations". William tersely dismissed these suggestions, saying, "It seems to me very extraordinary that it should be impossible to have esteem and regard for a young man without it being criminal."

18th century 
 1711 – Anne, Queen of Great Britain ended a long-lasting intimate friendship with Sarah Churchill, Duchess of Marlborough. The "Queen's Favourite" hoped to wield power equal to that of a government minister. When their relationship soured, she blackmailed Anne with letters revealing their intimacy, and accused her of perverting the course of national affairs by keeping lesbian favourites. Anne and Sarah had invented petnames for themselves during their youths which they continued to use after Anne became queen: Mrs Freeman (Sarah) and Mrs Morley (Anne). Effectively a business manager, Sarah had control over the queen's position, from her finances to people admitted to the royal presence.
 1722 – John Quincy writes about lesbianism in his second edition of the Lexicon Physico Medicum. According to Quincy, confricatrices or confictrices were terms used by authors for lesbians "who have learned to titulate one another with their clitoris, in imitation of venereal intercourse with men".
1724 – Margaret Clap, better known as Mother Clap, ran a coffee house from 1724 to 1726 in Holborn, London. The coffee house served as a Molly House for the underground gay community. Her house was popular, being well known within the gay community. She cared for her customers, and catered especially to the gay men who frequented it. She was known to have provided "beds in every room of the house" and commonly had "thirty or forty of such Kind of Chaps every Night, but more especially on Sunday Nights".

1726 – Three men (Gabriel Lawrence, William Griffin, and Thomas Wright) were hanged at Tyburn for sodomy following a raid of Margaret Clap's Molly House.
1727 – Charles Hitchen, a London Under City Marshal, was convicted of attempted sodomy at a Molly House. Hitchen had abused his position of power to extort bribes from brothels and pickpockets to prevent arrest, and he particularly leaned on the thieves to make them fence their goods through him. Hitchen had frequently picked up soldiers for sex, but had eluded prosecution by the Society for the Reformation of Manners.
1728 –18th century London Molly House, Julius Caesar Taylor's, Tottenham Court Road, Jenny Greensleeves' Molly House, Durham Yard, off The Strand, The Golden Ball, Bond's Stables, off Chancery Lane, Royal Oak Molly House, Giltspur Street, Smithfield and Three Tobacco Rolls Covent Garden were operating in London.
1730 – The term "lesbian" to describe same sex relationships between women comes into use around the 1730s.
1735 – Conyers Place wrote "Reason Insufficient Guide to Conduct Mankind in Religion".
1736 – Love letters from Lord John Hervey to Stephen Fox PC, a British peer and Member of Parliament, show that they had been living in a homosexual relationship for a period of ten years, from 1726 to 1736.
1749 – Thomas Cannon wrote "Ancient and Modern Pederasty Investigated and Exemplified". 
1772 – The first public debate about homosexuality began during the trial of Captain Robert Jones who was convicted of the capital offence of sodomising a thirteen-year-old boy. The debate during the case and with the background of the 1772 Macaroni prosecutions considered Christian intolerance of homosexuality and the human rights of men who were homosexual. Jones was acquitted and received a pardon on condition that he leave the country. He ended up living in grandeur with his footman at Lyon, in the South of France.
1773 – Charles Crawford wrote "A Dissertation on the Phaedon of Plato".
1776 –18th century London gay bar, Harlequin (Nag's Head Court, Covent Garden) was operating
1778 - Eleanor Butler & Sarah Ponsonby, known as The Ladies of Llangollen, were two upper-class Irish women whose relationship scandalised and fascinated their contemporaries during the late 18th and early 19th centuries. The pair moved to a Gothic house in Llangollen, North Wales, in 1780 after leaving Ireland to escape the social pressures of conventional marriages. Over the years, numerous distinguished visitors called upon them. Guests included Shelley, Byron, Wellington and Wordsworth, who wrote a sonnet about them.
1785 – Jeremy Bentham becomes one of the first people to argue for the decriminalisation of sodomy in England, which was punishable by hanging. The essay Offences Against One's Self, written about 1785, argued for the liberalisation of laws prohibiting homosexual sex. He argued that homosexual acts did not weaken men, nor threaten population or marriage. The essay was never published in his lifetime.
1797 – The Encyclopedia Britannica published a brief mention of homosexuality in the article about Greece.

19th century 

1800 – William Blake paints "Lot and His Daughters". The Book of Genesis in chapters 11–14 and 18–19 describes Lot and his family, living through the fire and brimstone sent against Sodom and Gomorrah apparently for either rape, transgression of the laws of hospitality, or homosexuality. "Lot and His Daughters" however portrays the part of the story that involves incest, not homosexuality: the story in Genesis describes how the daughters of Lot, along the road as they fled from Sodom and Gomorrah, got their father drunk so that after he fell asleep they could have sex with him and in this way get children from him.
1806 – Yorkshire gentlewoman Anne Lister starts writing love letters to and from Eliza Raine. Lister actively participated in and wrote about her lesbian relationships in an encrypted diary. Although she did not use the word lesbian, at age thirty, she wrote, "I love and only love the fairer sex and thus, beloved by them in turn my heart revolts from any other love but theirs."
1810 – The nineteenth century began with a wave of prosecutions against homosexual men. On 14 January, a farmer in West Yorkshire wrote in his diary that capital punishment seemed an unacceptably cruel response to a sexual behavior that nature or God had ordained in an individual. (The diary entry was discovered in 2020.) On 8 July, the Bow Street Runners raided The White Swan, a tumbledown pub of Tudor origin near Drury Lane. Twenty-seven men were arrested on suspicion of sodomy and attempted sodomy. 
1811 – The Scottish court case Woods and Pirie vs Dame Cumming Gordon showed two teachers are accused of having a lesbian relationship by a pupil, claiming they had indecent sexual relationships. However, one judge found that sex between women was "equally imaginary with witchcraft, sorcery or carnal copulation with the devil", illustrating notions at the time that tied sexuality with masculinity.
1812 – James Miranda Barry graduated from the Medical School of Edinburgh University as a doctor. Barry went on to serve as an army surgeon working overseas. Barry lived as a man but was found to be female-bodied upon his death in 1865.
1828 – The Buggery Act 1533 was repealed and replaced by the Offences against the Person Act 1828. Buggery remained punishable by death.
1833 – 24-year old actor Eliza Edwards is found dead. The corpse was taken to Guys Hospital for an autopsy, where it is discovered that they were 'a perfect man'.
1835 – The last two men to be executed in Britain for buggery, James Pratt and John Smith, were arrested on 29 August in London after being spied upon while having sex in a private room; they were hanged on 27 November.
1838 – Harry Stokes was a master bricklayer, beerhouse manager and special constable in Manchester. He was assigned a female gender at birth but lived as a man. Harry had two long-term relationships with women, both of which lasted over 20 years. In 1838 and 1859 his gender variance became the subject of local and national newspaper articles in which he was described as a 'man-woman' and a 'female husband'.
1852 – John Martin paints The Destruction of Sodom and Gomorah. Sodom was (supposedly) destroyed for the sin of sodomy, although a strong case has been made that violence against persons and transgression of the laws of hospitality, including a demand that he hand over his houseguests (who happened to be angels) to the ruffian citizens of the town, were more important at the time of the composition of the story in Genesis, chapter 19.
1861 – The death penalty for buggery was abolished when the Offences Against the Person Act 1828 was replaced with the Offences Against the Person Act 1861. A total of 8921 men had been prosecuted since 1806 for sodomy with 404 sentenced to death and 56 executed. Homosexuality remained illegal until 1967 in England and Wales and 1980 in Scotland.
1866 – Marriage was defined as being between a man and a woman (preventing future same-sex marriages). In the case of Hyde v. Hyde and Woodmansee (a case of polygamy), Lord Penzance's judgment began "Marriage as understood in Christendom is the voluntary union for life of one man and one woman, to the exclusion of all others."
1871 – Ernest 'Stella' Boulton and Frederick 'Fanny' Park, two Victorian transvestites and suspected homosexuals, appeared as defendants in the celebrated Boulton and Park trial in London, charged "with conspiring and inciting persons to commit an unnatural offence". The indictment was against Lord Arthur Clinton, Ernest Boulton, Frederic Park, Louis Hurt, John Fiske, Martin Cumming, William Sommerville and C. H. Thompson. The prosecution was unable to prove either that they had committed any homosexual offence or that men wearing women's clothing was an offence in English law. Lord Arthur Clinton killed himself before his trial.

1872 – Sheridan Le Fanu publishes the novella Carmilla, which depicts the tale of a lesbian vampire luring young women for her mother to sacrifice 
1883 – John Maynard Keynes, Baron Keynes of Tilton, CB FBA was born. Openly homosexual, Keynes a British economist whose ideas have profoundly affected the theory and practice of modern macroeconomics, as well as the economic policies of governments. He diarised his homosexual encounters and records that he had 65 encounters in 1909, 26 in 1910, 39 in 1911.
1885 – The British Parliament enacted Criminal Law Amendment Act 1885, section 11 of which, known as the Labouchere Amendment, prohibited gross indecency between males. It thus became possible to prosecute homosexuals for engaging in sexual acts where buggery or attempted buggery could not be proven.
1885 – A collection of the poems of Sappho were translated and published in English by Henry Thornton Wharton as Sappho: Memoir, Text, and Selected Renderings. Wharton maintained a homosexual interpretation of "Ode to Aphrodite".
1889 – The Cleveland Street scandal occurred, when a homosexual male brothel in Cleveland Street, Fitzrovia, London, was raided by police after they discovered telegraph boys had been working there as rent boys. A number of aristocratic clients were discovered, including Lord Arthur Somerset, equerry to the Prince of Wales. The Prince of Wales's son Prince Albert Victor and Lord Euston were also implicated in the scandal.
Scotland became the last jurisdiction in Europe to abolish the death penalty for same-sex sexual intercourse, which reduced the penalty to life imprisonment in a penitentiary.
1895 – Oscar Wilde, tried for gross indecency over a relationship with Lord Alfred Douglas, was sentenced to two years in prison with hard labour.
 The gay English poet A. E. Housman writes a poem about the trial of Oscar Wilde. Due to its content, it was not published until after Housman's death.
 Winston Churchill was accused of having committed "acts of gross immorality of the Oscar Wilde type" while a cadet at Sandhurst. Churchill sued the accuser for defamation and was awarded £400 in damages. Throughout his life, Churchill showed little interest in women other than his wife, enjoyed the company of homosexuals, and was deeply attached to male friends and his long-standing secretary Edward Marsh, although there is no evidence of any physical relationships.
 1897 – George Cecil Ives organises the first homosexual rights group in England, the Order of Chaeronea. Dr Helen Boyle and her partner, Mabel Jones, set up the first women-run general practice in Brighton, including offering free therapy for poor women. Helen Boyle also founded the National Council for Mental Hygiene (which subsequently became MIND) in 1922. British sexologist Havelock Ellis publishes Sexual Inversion, the first volume in an intended series called Studies in the Psychology of Sex. He argues that homosexuality is not a disease but a natural anomaly occurring throughout human and animal history, and should be accepted, not treated. He describes lesbians as being more like men, possessing male intelligence and propensity for independence. The book is banned in England for being obscene; the subsequent volumes in the series are published in the US and not sold in England until 1936. 
 1898 – George Bedborough is convicted of obscenity, for selling a copy of Havelock Ellis's book Studies in the Psychology of Sex Vol. 2, on the topic of homosexuality.

20th century 

1906  – Dr. Louisa Martindale set up a private practice in Brighton and became the first woman GP. With a group of other Brighton feminists she developed the New Sussex Hospital for Women and Children, where she was Senior Surgeon and Physician. She later became a specialist in the early treatment of cervical cancer and was appointed a CBE in 1931. Louisa lived with her partner Ismay FitzGerald for three decades, and wrote of her love for her in her autobiography A Woman Surgeon, published in 1951.
1909 – The transgender writer Irene Clyde publishes Beatrice the Sixteenth, a science fiction utopian novel set in a postgender society.
1910  – While homosexuals in London had always socialised in public places such as pubs, coffee houses and tea shops, it possibly became more overt. Waitresses ensured that a section of Lyons Corner House in Piccadilly Circus was reserved for homosexuals. The section became known as the Lily Pond.
1912  – London's first gay pub (as we now know the term), Madame Strindgberg's The Cave of the Golden Calf opened in Heddon Street, off Regent Street.
1913  – The British Society for the Study of Sex Psychology is founded by a group of theorists and activists, with Edward Carpenter as president. Carpenter was a proponent of the theory of the homosexual as a third sex, and lived openly with his lover, George Merrill. The society was particularly concerned with homosexuality, aiming to combat legal discrimination against homosexuality with scientific understanding. Members included George Cecil Ives, Edward Carpenter, Montague Summers, Stella Browne, Laurence Housman, Havelock Ellis, George Bernard Shaw, and Ernest Jones.
1914 – The First World War broke out in August 1914 affecting thousand of lives. Openly homosexual writer Joe Randolph "J. R." Ackerley was commissioned as a second lieutenant and assigned to the 8th Battalion of the East Surrey Regiment. In June 1915, he was sent to France. On 1 July 1916, he was wounded at the Battle of the Somme. He was shot in the arm and suffered shards of a whisky bottle becoming imbedded in his side from an explosion. After lying wounded in a shell-hole for six hours, he was rescued and sent home for sick-leave. In May 1917, Ackerley led an attack in the Arras region where he was wounded, this time in the buttock and thigh. While he was waiting for help, the Germans arrived and took him prisoner. As an officer, he was assigned to an internment camp in neutral Switzerland. Here he began his play, The Prisoners of War, which expresses the cabin fever of captivity and his frustrated longings for another male English prisoner.
1916 – Urania, a privately published feminist gender studies journal, is established. It challenges gender stereotypes and advances the abolishment of gender; each issue is headed with the statement: "There are no 'men' or 'women' in Urania." Urania was edited by Eva Gore-Booth, Esther Roper, Irene Clyde, Dorothy Cornish, and Jessey Wade.
1917 - May Toupie Lowther, known as 'Toupie', was awarded the Croix de Guerre for her World War One efforts, which included the creation of an all-female ambulance unit. The unit travelled to France and close to the front line where they retrieved the wounded using their own cars. Lowther was a close friend of Radclyffe Hall, author of The Well of Loneliness and Hall drew on some of Lowther's experiences in depicting the life and character of its protagonist Stephen.
1918 – World War I ends. Army historian A.D. Harvey writes that "at least 230 soldiers were court-martialled, convicted and sentenced to terms of imprisonment for homosexual offences" during World War I. The gay English poet and writer W. H. Auden attended his first boarding school where he met Christopher Isherwood; when reintroduced to Isherwood in 1925, Auden probably fell in love with Isherwood and in the 1930s they maintained a sexual friendship in intervals between their relations with others.

1920s 

1921  – The Criminal Law Amendment Act was amended in the House of Commons to include a section to make sexual "acts of gross indecency" between women illegal, and was passed in the House of Commons. However the section was defeated in the House of Lords, in part due to the belief that criminalizing lesbian sex would only increase the frequency of such acts. As such, this amendment never became law.
1924  – Bertolt Brecht and Lion Feuchtwanger worked on an adaptation of Christopher Marlowe's Edward II about the homosexual life of Edward II and Piers Gaveston, 1st Earl of Cornwall that proved to be a milestone in Brecht's early theatrical and dramaturgical development.
1928 – The Well of Loneliness by Radclyffe Hall was published in the UK by Jonathan Cape. This sparked great legal controversy and brought the topic of homosexuality to public conversation. James Douglas, editor of the Sunday Express newspaper, began a campaign to suppress the book with poster and billboard advertising. Cape panicked and sent a copy of The Well of Loneliness to the Home Secretary, William Joynson-Hicks (a Conservative) for his opinion; he took only two days to reply that the work was "gravely detrimental to the public interest" and if Cape did not withdraw it voluntarily, criminal proceedings would be brought against him. Cape suppressed the book after only two editions.
1929  – The death of Edward Carpenter (29 August 1844 – 28 June 1929), an English socialist poet, socialist philosopher, anthologist, and early gay activist.

1930s 
1932  – Sir Noël Coward wrote "Mad About the Boy", a song which dealt with the theme of homosexual love; it was introduced in the 1932 revue, but due to the risque nature of the song, it was sung by a woman. The News of the World published a story, 'Amazing Change of Sex', about a trans man from Sussex who transitioned 'from Margery to Maurice', namely Colonel Sir Victor Barker (1895–1960) who married Elfrida Haward in Brighton. Barker's birth sex (female) is later revealed and the marriage is consequently annulled. Barker went on to appear in freak show displays in New Brighton, Southend-on-Sea and Blackpool.
1935 – Queer club culture in the 1930s was vibrant and varied, especially in the growing post-First World War underground scene. Music was central to the character of many of these venues, from the music hall artists to the expanding London jazz scene. At the centre of the action was the Shim Sham Club at 37 Wardour Street, an unlicensed jazz club popular with black and gay audiences, and its successor the Rainbow Roof.
1936  – A 30-year-old British athletic champion, Mark Weston of Plymouth, transitioned from female to male. The story appeared in some national newspapers, including the News of the World (31 May 1936). The reportage was accurate and sensitive. In the words of L. R. Broster, the Harley Street surgeon who treated him, 'Mark Weston, who has always been brought up as a female, is a male and should continue to live as such'. Nightwood by Djuna Barnes, a novel that portrays explicit homosexuality between women, is published in London by Faber and Faber.

1940s 
 1940 – Throughout the forties, attitudes to homosexuality were relaxed. With conscription into the armed services, men and women were removed from their homes and families were relocated to a military life. John Howard described the services as being tolerant of 'homosex', which was same-sex sexual activity but which makes no assumption about the sexuality of its participants. In the Navy masturbation between seamen was known as a "flip". Jivani claims that in the Navy 'wingers' were sexual relationships between seamen of unequal rank and 'oppos' were sexual relationships between men of similar rank. In the army sex between men was often viewed by officers and other ranks as a legitimate response to the absence of women and the need for safe sexual relief. Both in the Army and the RAF the system of employing young boys as batmen who acted as orderlies for their officers was sometimes rooted in sex.
1940 – Urania, a feminist gender studies journal with strong pacifist editorial is established. The journal's goal was the abolition of gender in order to build a society of equal women whose sex and orientation were unimportant. Urania remained privately published for its 24-year history.
 1939–1945 Blackout during World War II afforded men many new opportunities for sexual encounters that many wouldn't have experienced before. Men could find each other under the cover of complete darkness. They were also put into situations which would never have occurred in civvy life. 
1945 – World War II ends.  6,508,000 men and women had served in the British Armed Forces during World War II
 Following the war, moral attitudes to prostitution and homosexuality rapidly changed. The Anglican Public Morality Council declared that the police were once again 'conducting a campaign against this deplorable (homosexual sex) offences'. In London, gay men in Piccadilly and Leicester Square were targeted and anyone caught charged with being "concerned together in committing an act of gross indecency"
1946 – Harold Gillies and a colleague carried out one of the first sex reassignment surgeries from female to male on Michael Dillon. In 1951 he and colleagues carried out one of the first modern sex reassignment surgery from male to female using a flap technique on Roberta Cowell, which became the standard for 40 years.

1950s 
Throughout the cold war atmosphere of the 1950s, when witch hunts later called the Lavender Scare were ruining the lives of many gay men and lesbian women in the United States, the parallel political atmosphere in Britain was virulently anti-homosexual. The then Home Secretary, Sir David Maxwell Fyfe, had promised "a new drive against male vice" that would "rid England of this plague." As many as 1,000 men were locked up in Britain's prisons every year amid a widespread police clampdown on homosexual offences. Undercover officers acting as "agents provocateurs" would pose as gay men soliciting in public places. The prevailing mood was one of barely concealed paranoia.
1950 – In Rotherham, an English schoolteacher, Kenneth Crowe, aged 37, was found dead wearing his wife's clothes and a wig. He approached a man on his way home from the pub, who upon discovering Crowe was male, beat and strangled him. The killer, John Cooney, was found not guilty of murder and sentenced to five years for manslaughter.
1951 – Roberta Cowell a former World War II Spitfire pilot, becomes the first transgender woman to undergo male-to-female confirmation surgery on 16 May. Cowell continued her career as a racing driver and published her autobiography in 1954. Ivor Novello Anglo-Welsh matinee idol, author and composer, noted for his hospitality and homosexuality dies. 
1952 – Sir John Nott-Bower, commissioner of Scotland Yard began to weed out homosexuals from the British Government at the same time as McCarthy was conducting a federal homosexual witch hunt in the US.
1953 – John Gielgud, the actor-director, was arrested on 20 October in Chelsea for cruising in a public lavatory, and was subsequently fined. When the news broke he was in Liverpool on the pre-London tour of a new play. He was paralysed by nerves at the prospect of going onstage, but fellow players, led by Sybil Thorndike, encouraged him. The audience gave him a standing ovation, showing that they didn't care about his private life. The episode affected Gielgud's health and he suffered a nervous breakdown months later. He did not acknowledge publicly that he was gay.
Edward Montagu (the 3rd Baron Montagu of Beaulieu) was charged and committed for trial at Winchester Assizes, firstly in 1953 for having underage sex with a 14-year-old boy scout at his beach hut on the Solent, a charge he always denied. The American Institute of Public Relations had just voted him the most promising young PR man when he was arrested. Although he enjoyed the support of his close family and a wide variety of friends, for a year or so he became "the subject of endless blue jokes and innumerable bawdy songs". This was not to be Montagu's first arrest during this witch hunt period.
1954 – Michael Pitt-Rivers and Peter Wildeblood were arrested and charged with having committed specific acts of "indecency" with RAF airmen Edward McNally and John Reynolds; they were also accused of conspiring with Edward Montagu (the 3rd Baron Montagu of Beaulieu) to commit these offences. The Director of Public Prosecutions gave his assurance that the witnesses Reynolds and McNally would not be prosecuted in any circumstances, but Michael Pitt-Rivers, Montagu and Peter Wildeblood were tried and imprisoned at Winchester in 1954. This set off a chain of events which would lead to the decriminalisation of homosexuality in 1967

1954 – Alan Turing, an English mathematician, logician, cryptanalyst and computer scientist, influential in the development of computer science, committed suicide. He had been given a course of female hormones (chemical castration) by doctors as an alternative to prison after being prosecuted by the police because of his homosexuality. 
1954 –The Wolfenden Committee is formed with Sir John Wolfenden as chairman. This follows from the trial of Edward Montagu, Michael Pitt-Rivers and Peter Wildeblood began on 15 March in the hall of Winchester Castle. All three defendants were convicted. The Sunday Times published an article entitled "Law and Hypocrisy" on 28 March that dealt with this trial and its outcome. Soon after, on 10 April, the New Statesman printed an article called "The Police and the Montagu Case". A month after the Montagu trial the Home Secretary Sir David Maxwell Fyfe agreed to appoint a committee to examine and report on the law covering homosexual offences (this would become known as The Wolfenden Report). 
1956 – The Sexual Offences Act recognises the crime of sexual assault between women.
1957 – The Report of the Departmental Committee on Homosexual Offences and Prostitution (better known as the Wolfenden report, after Lord Wolfenden) was published. It advised the British Government that homosexuality should be made legal (although this would take another decade).
1958 – The Homosexual Law Reform Society is founded in the United Kingdom following the Wolfenden report the previous year, to begin a campaign to make homosexuality legal in the UK.
1959 – Alan Horsfall, Labour councillor for Nelson, Lancashire, tables a motion to his local Labour party to back the decriminalisation of homosexuality. The motion is rejected, but Horsfall and fellow activist Antony Grey later form the North West Homosexual Law Reform Committee. ITV, at the time the UK's only national commercial broadcaster, broadcasts the UK's first gay TV drama, South, starring Peter Wyngarde.

1960s 
1961  – Victim was the first English-language film to use the word "homosexual". It premiered in the UK on 31 August 1961. 
1963  – The Minorities Research Group (MRG) became the UK's first lesbian social and political organisation. They went on to publish their own lesbian magazine called Arena Three.
1964  – The North West Homosexual Law Reform Committee was founded, abandoning the medical model of homosexuality as a sickness and calling for its decriminalisation. The first meeting was held in Manchester. The North West branch of the national Homosexual Law Reform Committee became the national Committee for Homosexual Equality in 1969 and in 1971 after the advent of the Gay Liberation Front in 1970, changed its name to Campaign for Homosexual Equality.
1965  – In the House of Lords, Lord Arran proposed the decriminalisation of male homosexual acts (lesbian acts had never been illegal). A UK opinion poll finds that 93% of respondents see homosexuality as a form of illness requiring medical treatment.
1966  – In the House of Commons Conservative MP Humphry Berkeley introduce a bill to legalise male homosexual relations along the lines of the Wolfenden report. Berkeley was well known to his colleagues as a homosexual, according to a 2007 article published in The Observer and was unpopular. His Bill was given a second reading by 164 to 107 on 11 February, but fell when Parliament was dissolved soon after. Unexpectedly, Berkeley lost his seat in the 1966 general election, and ascribed his defeat to the unpopularity of his bill on homosexuality. The Beaumont Society, a London-based social/support group for people who cross-dress, are transvestite or who are transsexual, was founded. The society takes its name from Charles-Geneviève-Louis-Auguste-André-Timothée d'Éon de Beaumont (the Chevalier d'Éon) a French spy and diplomat, born a man, who lived as a woman for the last 33 years of her life, and after whom Havelock Ellis invented the term Eonism to refer to transgender conditions.
1967 – Ten years after the Wolfenden Report, MP Leo Abse introduced the Sexual Offences Bill 1967 supported by Labour MP Roy Jenkins, then the Labour Home Secretary. When passed, The Act decriminalised homosexual acts between two men over 21 years of age in private in England and Wales. The 1967 Act did not extend to Scotland, Northern Ireland, the Channel Islands or the Isle of Man, where all homosexual behaviour remained illegal. The privacy restrictions of the act meant a third person could not be present and men could not have sex in a hotel. These restrictions were overturned in the European Court of Human Rights in 2000.
The book Homosexual Behavior Among Males by Wainwright Churchill breaks ground as a scientific study approaching homosexuality as a fact of life and introduces the term "homoerotophobia", a possible precursor to "homophobia". The courts decided that transsexuals could not get married; Justice Ormerod found that in the case of Talbot (otherwise Poyntz) v. Talbot where one spouse was a post-operative transsexual their marriage was not permitted. Justice Ormerod stated that Marriage is a relationship which depends on sex, not on gender.
1969  – Campaign for Homosexual Equality (CHE) formed as the first British gay activist group. In Scotland, gay right organisation the Scottish Minorities Group is founded by Ian Dunn (it was later known as Outright Scotland).

1970s 
1970 – Gay Liberation Front (GLF) was established at London School of Economics on 13 October, in response to debates many gay men and lesbians were having in Britain about the way they were treated. The formation of Gay Liberation Front was also influenced by the Stonewall Rebellion in the USA that started on 28 June 1969. 
On the 27th of November 150 members of the Gay Liberation Front held a torchlight rally in Highbury Fields to protest against the continual harassment of the gay community in London by the police. In the case between April Ashley and Arthur Cameron Corbett, their marriage was annulled on the basis that Ashley, a transsexual woman, was a man under then-current British law. This set a legal precedent for trans people in Britain, meaning that the birth certificates of transsexual and intersex people could not be changed.
1971 – The Nationwide Festival of Light supported by Cliff Richard, Mary Whitehouse, Malcolm Muggeridge and Lord Longford was held by British Christians who were concerned about the development of the permissive society in the UK and in particular, homosexuality and out of wedlock sexual activity. The GLF interrupted the festival with a series of demonstrations. Lesbians invaded the platform of the Women's Liberation Conference in Skegness, demanding recognition The Nullity of Marriage Act was passed, explicitly banning same-sex marriages between same-sex couples in England and Wales. The parliamentary debates on the 1971 act included discussion on the issue of transsexualism but not homosexuality.
1972 – The First British Gay Pride Rally was held in London with an estimated 200-700 people marching from Trafalgar Square to Hyde Park.  Gay News, Britain's first gay newspaper was founded.
1973 – London Icebreakers forms, offering a 24-hour helpline staffed exclusively by LGB people and offered gay-affirmative support. The Campaign for Homosexual Equality holds the first British gay rights conference in Morecambe, Lancashire. The Manchester Gay Alliance formed by the University's Lesbian & Gay Society, CHE, a lesbian group and transvestite/ transsexual group. In late 1973 Dr. Carol Steele and another transsexual woman (Linda B.) formed the Manchester TV/TS Group (a group for transvestites and transsexuals).
1974 – Maureen Colquhoun came out as the first Lesbian MP for the Labour Party. When elected she was married in a heterosexual marriage. After coming out, her party refused to support her. The First National TV/TS (Transvestite/Transsexual Conference) is held in Leeds. Jan Morris, one of Britain's top journalists who has covered wars and rebellions around the globe and climbed Mount Everest in 1952, publishes Conundrum, a personal account of her transition, widely hailed as a classic.

1975 – The groundbreaking film portraying homosexual gay icon Quentin Crisp's life, The Naked Civil Servant (based on the 1968 autobiography and starring John Hurt) was transmitted by Thames Television for the British Television channel ITV. British journal Gay Left begins publication. British Home Stores sacked openly gay trainee Tony Whitehead; a national campaign subsequently picketed their stores. The Liberal Party passed a conference resolution in support of equality for gay people including an equal age of consent.
1976 – Britain's political pressure group Liberty, under its original name National Council for Civil Liberties (NCCL), called for an equal age of consent of 14 in Britain. The term Gay Bowel Syndrome was coined to describe a range of rectal diseases seen among gay male patients; in the pre-AIDS era, this is the first medical term to relate to gay men.

1976 – The  was established by Phillip Cox and Paul Welch. It was chaired by Steven Power, a 1970s gay activist, from 1977 until 1980 when he became 21. It was the first officially registered gay youth group in Europe. 
1977 – The first gay lesbian Trades Union Congress (TUC) conference took place to discuss workplace rights for Gays and Lesbians.
1978 – The International Lesbian and Gay Association (ILGA) was founded as the International Gay Association (IGA) on 8 August during the conference of the Campaign for Homosexual Equality in Coventry, England, at a meeting attended by 30 men representing 17 organisations from 14 countries. The Coventry conference also called upon Amnesty International to take up the issue of persecution of lesbians and gays.

1980s 

1980 – The Criminal Justice (Scotland) Act 1980 decriminalised homosexual acts between two men over 21 years of age "in private" in Scotland. British documentary A Change of Sex aired on BBC2, enabling viewers to follow the social and medical transition of Julia Grant; also provides a snapshot of the Gender Identity Clinic at Charing Cross Hospital in London. The Self Help Association for Transsexuals (SHAFT) was formed as an information collecting and disseminating body for trans-people. The association later became known as 'Gender Dysphoria Trust International' (GDTI). The first Black Gay and Lesbian Group was formed in the UK. Lionel Blue became the first British rabbi to come out as gay. The UK's first television series specifically aimed at a gay audience is broadcast on London Weekend Television. Called Gay Life, the programme airs late on Sundays and runs for two series. Former British soldier and gay rights activist Dudley Cave establishes the "Lesbian and Gay Bereavement Project" to support bereaved lesbian and gay people who could not be legally recognised as next-of-kin.
1981 – The European Court of Human Rights in Dudgeon v. United Kingdom struck down Northern Ireland's criminalisation of homosexual acts between consenting adults. The first UK case of AIDS was recorded when a 49-year-old man was admitted to Brompton Hospital in London suffering from PCP (Pneumocystis carinii pneumonia). He died ten days later. The first bisexual group in the United Kingdom, London Bisexual Group, was founded.
1982  – The Homosexual Offences (Northern Ireland) Order 1982 decriminalised homosexual acts between two men over 21 years of age "in private" in Northern Ireland. Terry Higgins dies of AIDS in St Thomas' Hospital London, his friends and partner Martyn Butler set up the Terry Higgins Trust (which became the Terrence Higgins Trust), the first UK AIDS charity.
1983  – Britain reports 17 cases of AIDS. Gay men are asked not to donate blood. UK Crown Dependency Guernsey (Including Alderney, Herm and Sark) decriminalised homosexuality.
1984  – Chris Smith, newly elected to the UK parliament declares: "My name is Chris Smith. I'm the Labour MP for Islington South and Finsbury, and I'm gay", making him the first openly out homosexual politician in the UK parliament. Britain reports 108 cases of AIDS with 46 deaths (from AIDS). The Politics of Bisexuality signals the growth of separate bisexual community organising. Lesbians and Gays Support the Miners, a campaign of LGBT support for striking workers in the miners' strike of 1984 and 1985, is launched.
1985  –  AIDS hysteria grows in the UK when passengers on the Queen Elizabeth 2 curtailed their holiday as a person with AIDS was discovered on board. Cunard were criticised for trying to cover this up. A London support group Body Positive was set up as a self-help group for people affected by HTLV-3 and AIDS. Health Minister, Kenneth Clarke, enacted powers to detain people with AIDS in hospital against their will, potentially preventing people coming forward for treatment.
1986  –Mark Rees, a trans-man, brings a case to the European Court of Human Rights, stating that UK law prevented him from gaining legal status recognising him as male. The case was lost but the court noted the seriousness of the issues facing trans people.
1987  – Conservative Prime Minister Margaret Thatcher at the 1987 Conservative party conference, issued the statement stating "Children who need to be taught to respect traditional moral values are being taught that they have an inalienable right to be gay". Backbench Conservative MPs and Peers had already begun a backlash against the 'promotion' of homosexuality and, in December 1987, Clause 28 is introduced into the local government bill by Dame Jill Knight, Conservative MP for Birmingham Edgbaston. The first UK specialist HIV ward was opened by Diana, Princess of Wales; at the opening she made a point of not wearing protective gloves or a mask when she shook hands with the patients. AZT, the first HIV drug to show promise of suppressing the disease was made available in the UK for the first time. In Manchester, Operation Spanner carried out by police resulted in group of homosexuals being convicted for assault occasioning actual bodily harm for their involvement in consensual sadomasochism over a ten-year period.

1988  – Section 28 of the Local Government Act 1988 enacted as an amendment to the United Kingdom's Local Government Act 1986, on 24 May 1988 stated that a local authority "shall not intentionally promote homosexuality or publish material with the intention of promoting homosexuality" or "promote the teaching in any maintained school of the acceptability of homosexuality as a pretended family relationship". The act was introduced by Margaret Thatcher. Almost identical legislation was enacted for Scotland by the Westminster Parliament. Princess Margaret opens the UK's first residential support centre for people living with HIV and AIDS in London at London Lighthouse. Sir Ian McKellen came out on BBC Radio 3 in response to the governments proposed Section 28 in the British Parliament. McKellen has stated that he was influenced in his decision by the advice and support of his friends, among them noted gay author Armistead Maupin.
1989  – The campaign group Stonewall UK is set up to oppose Section 28 and other barriers to equality.

1990s 

1990  – In July, following the murders in a short period of time, of Christopher Schliach, Henry Bright, William Dalziel and Michael Boothe, hundreds of lesbians and gay men marched from the park where Boothe had been killed to Ealing Town Hall and held a candlelit vigil. The demonstration led to the formation of OutRage, who called for the police to start protecting gay men instead of arresting them. In September, lesbian and gay police officers established the Lesbian and Gay Police Association (Lagpa/GPA). The first gay pride event is held in Manchester. Oranges Are Not the Only Fruit by Jeanette Winterson, a semi-autobiographical screenplay about her lesbian life was shown on BBC television. Justin Fashanu became the first professional footballer to come out in the press (he subsequently committed suicide). Northern Ireland held their first Pride Parade. UK Crown Dependency of Jersey decriminalised homosexuality.
1991  – Gay Activist, Derek Jarman makes the Christopher Marlowe play Edward II from the early 1590s into a film which used modern costumes and made overt reference to the gay rights movement and the Stonewall riots. Queen singer Freddie Mercury announced that he had AIDS; he dies the following day.
1992  – UK Crown Dependency of Isle of Man repealed sodomy laws (homosexuality was still illegal until 1994). The first Pride Festival was held in Brighton. Europride was inaugurated in London and was attended by estimated crowds of over 100,000. Britain's first black gay play Boy with Beer by Paul Boakye opened in January at The Man in the Moon Theatre with nudity, simulated sex, and AIDS as a core concern. Acclaimed 20th century artist Francis Bacon died of pneumonia complicated by asthma while visiting a friend in Madrid.
 1993  – The radio DJ and comedian Kenny Everett and singer with the group Frankie goes to Hollywood, Holly Johnson, announced that they were HIV positive. Serial killer Colin Ireland was convicted of killing five gay men, who he picked up in the Coleherne leather bar. He was sentenced to life and died in 2012.
1994  – The Conservative Member of Parliament Edwina Currie introduced an amendment to lower the age of consent for homosexual acts, from 21 to 16 in line with that for heterosexual acts. The vote was defeated and the gay male age of consent was instead lowered to 18. The lesbian age of consent was not set. UK Crown Dependency of Isle of Man decriminalised homosexuality. Charity Save the Children dropped lesbian Sandi Toksvig as compere of its 75th-anniversary celebrations after she came out, but following a direct action protest by the Lesbian Avengers, Save the Children apologised. British filmmaker Derek Jarman died of AIDS Derek Jarman was a film-maker, artist and gay rights activist who became a major cultural figure in the late 1980s.
1996  – A breakthrough is made in the area of AIDS treatment; Highly Active Antiretroviral Therapy (HAART) is found to significantly delay the onset of AIDS in people living with HIV. The NHS makes the treatment available in the UK. HAART has a dramatic effect and many bed ridden AIDS patients return to work. The European Court of Human Rights heard Morris v. The United Kingdom and  Sutherland v. the United Kingdom, cases brought by Chris Morris and Euan Sutherland challenging the homosexual inequality in divided ages of consent. The government stated its intention to legislate to negate the court cases, which were put on hold.
The landmark case – P v S and Cornwall County Council – finds that an employee who was about to undergo gender reassignment was wrongfully dismissed. It was the first piece of case law, anywhere in the world, which prevented discrimination in employment or vocational education because someone is trans.

1997  – Angela Eagle, Labour MP for Wallasey, becomes the first MP to come out voluntarily as a lesbian. Gay partners were given equal immigration rights. Equality Network established in Scotland.
1998  – The Bolton 7, a group of gay and bisexual men were convicted at Bolton Crown Court of the offences of gross indecency under the Sexual Offences Act 1956 and of age of consent offences under the Criminal Justice and Public Order Act 1994. Although gay sex was partially decriminalised by the Sexual Offences Act 1967, they were all convicted under section 13 of the 1956 Act because more than two men had sex together, which was still illegal. The Lord Alli, a Labour Party life peer, becomes the first openly gay member of the House of Lords and one of a few openly gay Muslims. The Labour party introduced an amendment to Crime and Disorder Bill to set the age of consent at 16 for homosexual men. The amendment was then removed by the House of Lords.
1999  – In May, the Admiral Duncan, a gay pub in Soho was bombed by former British National Party member David Copeland, killing three people and wounding at least 70. Queer Youth Alliance was formed; The equal age of consent to the Crime and Disorder Bill proposed by the Labour government was blocked again in the House of Lords after a campaign headed by Conservative MP Baroness Young. Stephen Twigg became the first openly gay politician to be elected to the House of Commons. Michael Cashman became the first openly gay UK member elected to the European Parliament. The British Museum acquired the Warren Cup for £1.8 million to prevent its going abroad which was, at that time, the most expensive single item ever acquired by The British Museum. The cup depicts homosexual acts between Ancient Greek and Roman men and boys.

21st century

2000s 
2000 
 The Labour government stops banning homosexuals from the armed forces after the European Court of Human Rights rules it unlawful. The law will not actually be repealed until the Armed Forces Act 2016. 
 The Labour government introduces legislation to repeal Section 28 in England and Wales – Conservative MPs oppose the move. The bill is defeated by bishops and Conservatives in the House of Lords. 
 Scotland abolished Clause 2a (Section 28) of the Local Government Act in October though it remains in place in England and Wales. 
 HIV charity London Lighthouse merged with Terrence Higgins Trust as the Aled Richards Trust and Body Positive London, closed. Shrinkage of the HIV charity sector occurred largely as a result of Management of HIV/AIDS HAART treatment allowing people living with HIV to be more self-sufficient.

2001
 The last two pieces of unequal law regarding gay male sex are changed. In 1997 the European Commission of Human Rights found that the European Convention on Human Rights were violated by a discriminatory age of consent; the government submitted that it would propose a Bill to Parliament for a reduction of the age of consent for homosexual acts from 18 to 16. The Crime and Disorder Bill which proposed these amendments, was voted for in the House of Commons but rejected in the House of Lords. In 1998 it was reintroduced and again was voted for in the House of Commons but rejected in the House of Lords. It was reintroduced a third time in 1999 but the House of Lords amended it to maintain the age for buggery at 18 for both sexes. Provisions made in the Parliament Acts 1911 and 1949 made it possible to enact the bill without the Lords voting it through. The provisions of the Act came into force throughout the United Kingdom on 8 January 2001, lowering the age of consent to 16. Under the act consensual group sex for gay men is also decriminalised.
2002
 Same-sex couples are granted equal rights to adopt. 
 Alan Duncan becomes the first Conservative MP to admit being gay without being pushed. 
 Brian Dowling becomes the first openly gay children's television presenter in the UK on SMTV Live.
 In December 2002, the British Lord Chancellor's office publishes a Government Policy Concerning Transsexual People document that categorically states, "What transsexualism is not ... It is not a mental illness."
2003
 Section 28, which banned councils and schools from intentionally promoting homosexuality, is repealed in England and Wales and Northern Ireland. Employment Equality Regulations made it illegal to discriminate against lesbians, gays or bisexuals at work. 
 EuroPride was hosted in Manchester. 
 Celia Kitzinger and Sue Wilkinson, both British university professors, legally married in British Columbia, Canada, however on their return their same-sex marriage was not recognised under British law. Under the subsequent Civil Partnership Act 2004, it was instead converted into a civil partnership. The couple sued for recognition of their same-sex marriage.
2004 
 The  Civil Partnership Act 2004 is passed by the Labour Government, giving same-sex couples the same rights and responsibilities as married heterosexual couples in England, Scotland, Northern Ireland and Wales. 
 The Gender Recognition Act 2004 is passed by the Labour Government. The act gives people with gender dysphoria legal recognition as members of the sex appropriate to their gender identity (male or female) allowing them to acquire a Gender Recognition Certificate, affording them full recognition of their acquired sex in law for all purposes, including marriage.
2005 
 The first civil partnership formed under the Civil Partnership Act 2004 took place at 11:00 GMT 5 December between Matthew Roche and Christopher Cramp at St Barnabas Hospice, Worthing, West Sussex. The statutory 15-day waiting period was waived as Roche was suffering from a terminal illness: he died the following day. 
 The first partnership registered after the normal waiting period was held in Belfast on 19 December. 
 The Adoption and Children Act 2002 comes into force, allowing unmarried and same-sex couples to adopt children for the first time. 
 Twenty-four-year-old Jody Dobrowski is murdered on Clapham Common in a homophobic attack. 
 Chris Smith one of the first openly gay British MPs, (1984), becomes the first MP to acknowledge that he is HIV positive.
 The UK-based online newspaper PinkNews is launched, which is specifically marketed to the LGBT community.
2006 
 The Equality Act 2006 which establishes the Equality and Human Rights Commission (CEHR) and makes discrimination against lesbians and gay men in the provision of goods and services illegal, gains royal assent on 16 February. 
 The age of consent is equalised and Section 28 "successfully repealed" in the UK Crown Dependency of the Isle of Man. 
 Labour MP, Ben Bradshaw holds a civil partnership ceremony with partner, Neal Dalgleish, a BBC Newsnight journalist. 
 David Borrow, a Labour MP also holds a civil partnership with his boyfriend in May. 
 In May, Margot James becomes the first 'out' lesbian to be elected as a local councillor for the Brompton ward of Kensington & Chelsea. She subsequently became the first Tory Lesbian MP. 
 In total 3,648 couples formed civil partnerships in England and Wales between 21 December 2005 and 31 January 2006. Male partnerships are more popular (2,150 ceremonies) than women's (1,138).
2007
 The Equality Act (Sexual Orientation) Regulations becomes law on 30 April making discrimination against lesbians and gay men in the provision of goods and services illegal. Archbishop Vincent Nichols of Birmingham declared his opposition to the act, saying that the legislation contradicted the Catholic Church's moral values. He supported efforts to have Catholic adoption agencies exempted from sexual orientation regulations (they were ultimately successful in a judgement given on 17 March 2010). 
 Some 8,728 Civil Partnerships were conducted in 2007. 
 Dr Lewis Turner and Professor Stephen Whittle publish Engendered Penalties Transsexual and Transgender People's Experience of Inequality and Discrimination (Equalities Review) which is instrumental in ensuring the inclusion of trans people in the remit of the new Commission for Equalities and Human Rights. 
 Channel 4 released Clapham Junction, a TV drama partially based on the murder of Jody Dobrowski almost two years after his murder, to mark the 40th anniversary of decriminalisation of homosexuality in England and Wales. 
 Four openly gay, lesbian or bisexual MSPs are elected in the 2007–2011 Scottish Parliament, Ian Smith, Patrick Harvie, Margaret Smith and Joe FitzPatrick.
2008
 Treatment of lesbian parents and their children is equalised in the Human Fertilisation and Embryology Act 2008. The legislation allows for lesbians and their partners (both civil and de facto) equal access to legal presumptions of parentage in cases of in vitro fertilisation ("IVF") or assisted/self insemination (other than at home) from the moment the child is born. 
 Angela Eagle becomes the first female MP to enter into a civil partnership (with partner Maria Exall). 
 Parliament passes provisions in the Criminal Justice and Immigration Act, creating a new offence of incitement to homophobic hatred. Some 7,169 Civil partnerships were conducted in 2008. 
 Michael Causer, a gay teenager living in Liverpool, is seriously assaulted on 25 July because of his sexual orientation and later dies in hospital, aged 18.
2009 
 The Labour Government Prime Minister Gordon Brown makes an official public apology on behalf of the British government for the way in which Alan Turing was chemically castrated for being gay, after the war. 
 Opposition leader David Cameron apologises on behalf of the Conservative Party, for introducing Section 28 during Margaret Thatcher's third government. 
 Welsh rugby star Gareth Thomas becomes the first known top-level professional male athlete in a team sport to come out while still active in professional sport. 
 Nikki Sinclaire becomes the first openly lesbian member of the European Parliament for the UK delegation. Some 6,281 Civil Partnerships were conducted in 2009.

2010s 
2010 
 Pope Benedict XVI condemns British equality legislation for running contrary to "natural law" as he confirmed his first visit to the UK. 
 The Equality Act 2010 makes discrimination on grounds of gender reasignment and sexual orientation in employment and in the provision of goods and services illegal.
 The Supreme Court ruled that two gay men from Iran and Cameroon have the right to asylum in the UK and Lord Hope, who read out the judgment, said: To compel a homosexual person to pretend that his sexuality does not exist or suppress the behaviour by which to manifest itself is to deny him the fundamental right to be who he is. 
 Some 6,385 Civil Partnerships were conducted in Britain in 2010, 49% were men. 
 Claire Rayner, ally of the gay rights movement, dies. 
 Shadow Home Secretary Chris Grayling MP said that he thought bed and breakfast owners should be able to bar gay couples, however, under the Equality Act (Sexual Orientation) Regulations 2007 no-one can be refused goods or services on the grounds of their sexuality. Grayling subsequently was passed over as Home Secretary when the Coalition government came to power. 
 Parental orders for gay men and their partners became possible on 6 April 2010, reassigning the legal parents for gay men parenting children under surrogacy arrangements.

2011
England, Wales and Scotland allow gay and bi men to donate blood after a 1-year deferral period.
2012 
 In the year in which London hosted the Olympic Games, London hosts World Pride but the committee fails to secure funding and has to drastically cut back the parade and cancel many of the events. 
 The coalition government committed to legislate for gay marriage by 2015, but by 2012 still had not been included in the Queen's Speech. 
 Thousands of people sign an e-petition to feature Alan Turing, father of Computing and of Artificial Intelligence on the ten pound note. 
 Government Ministers pledge to push through legislation granting same-sex couples equal rights to get married despite the threat of a split with the Church of England and the continuance of current arrangements for the state recognition of canon law.
2013 
 The coalition government unveils its Marriage (Same Sex Couples) Bill on 25 January. On 21 May it passes its third reading in the House of Commons by a vote of 366 to 161. Altogether 133 Tories opposed the bill, along with 15 Labour MPs, four Lib Dems, eight Democratic Unionists and an independent. On 17 July 2013, royal assent is given to the Marriage (Same Sex Couples) Act 2013. 
 Queen Elizabeth II grants Alan Turing a posthumous pardon. 
 Nikki Sinclaire comes out as transgender, thus becoming the United Kingdom's first openly transgender Parliamentarian. 
 Civil partners Martyn Hall and Steven Preddy were successful in their case against B&B owners Peter and Hazelmary Bull. Hall and Preddy were refused a double room at the Bulls' B&B, Chymorvah Guest House, which courts found was in contravention of the 2007 Equality Act Regulations.
2014 
 Same-sex marriage becomes legal in England and Wales on 29 March under the Marriage (Same Sex Couples) Act 2013. 
 Legislation to allow same-sex marriage in Scotland was passed by the Scottish Parliament in February 2014, received royal assent on 12 March 2014 and took effect on 16 December 2014. 
 Queen Elizabeth II praises the London Lesbian and Gay Switchboard for their 40-year history, the first time the Crown has ever publicly supported the LGBT community. The Switchboard receives a comment from the Queen saying: "Best wishes and congratulations to all concerned on this most special anniversary."
2015 
 Mikhail Ivan Gallatinov and Mark Goodwin became the first couple to have a same-sex wedding in a UK prison after marrying at Full Sutton Prison in East Yorkshire. 
 Northern Ireland's assembly voted narrowly in favour of gay marriage equality but the largest party in the devolved parliament, the Democratic Unionist Party, subsequently vetoed any change in the law. 
 The Royal Vauxhall Tavern became the first ever building in the UK to be given a special "listing" status based on its LGBT history; it was accorded Grade II listed status by the UK's Department of Culture, Media and Sport. 
 Inga Beale, CEO of Lloyd's of London, became the first woman and the first openly bisexual person to be named number one in the OUTstanding & FT Leading LGBT executive power list.

2016 
 There are 40 LGBT MPs in the Parliament of the United Kingdom, which in 2016 is the most in any parliament around the world. 
 Hannah Blythyn, Jeremy Miles, and Adam Price became the first openly gay members of the Welsh Assembly. 
 Carl Austin-Behan was sworn in as Manchester's first openly gay Lord Mayor. 
 Northern Ireland allow gay and bi men to donate blood after a 1-year deferral period. 
 Prince William became the first member of Britain's royal family to appear on the cover of a gay magazine when he appeared on the cover of the July issue of Attitude; in the cover story, he also became the first British royal to openly condemn the bullying of the gay community. 
 British Government minister Justine Greening revealed that she was in a same-sex relationship, thus becoming the first out LGB female cabinet minister. 
 Elle printed special collectors' covers for their September 2016 issue, and one of them featured Hari Nef, which was the first time an openly transgender woman had been on the cover of a major commercial British magazine. 
 The British women's field hockey team won gold at the Olympics; as Kate and Helen Richardson-Walsh were both on that team, this made them the first same-sex married couple to win Olympic medals. 
 Nicholas Chamberlain became the first bishop in the Church of England to come out as gay, which occurred following threats of an outing from an unnamed Sunday newspaper. He said he lived with his partner in a celibate same-sex relationship, as required by the Bishops' guidelines, under which gay clergy must practice abstinence and may not marry. 
 Ivar Mountbatten came out as gay and revealed that he was in a relationship with James Coyle, an airline cabin services director whom he met whilst at a ski resort in Verbier. While not being a member of the British royal family, he is the first member of the extended family to come out as gay. 
 Anwen Muston, a British Labour Party politician, was elected to Wolverhampton City Council at the 2016 elections; this makes her the first openly transgender woman to be elected as a Labour representative. 
 The Armed Forces Act 2016 finally repeals "homosexual acts as a grounds of discharge from the armed forces". 
2017 
 In April 2017, the Parliament of the United Kingdom passed the Merchant Shipping (Homosexual Conduct) Act 2017. This private member's bill was drafted by Conservative MP John Glen. It repealed sections 146(4) and 147(3) of the Criminal Justice and Public Order Act 1994, which was labelled as the UK's last anti-gay law. It went into effect immediately after royal assent. 
 Andy Street became the United Kingdom's first openly gay, directly elected metro mayor. 
 Philippa York, formerly Robert Millar, came out as transgender, thus becoming the first former professional cyclist to have publicly transitioned; she had been one of Britain's most successful cyclists of all time. 
 British voters returned a record number of LGBTQ MPs to Parliament of the United Kingdom in the general election. Forty-five gay, lesbian or bi MPs were elected on Thursday 8 June, six more than in the previous parliament. The SNP registered the largest proportion of LGBTQ elected members in its parliamentary party, with seven of its 35 MPs identifying as such. 
 Ryan Atkin became the first openly gay official in English football.
2018 
 Lord Ivar Mountbatten married his same-sex partner, James Coyle, on 22 September 2018, becoming the first member of the British monarch's extended family to have a same-sex wedding.
2019 
 Laverne Cox was one of fifteen women chosen by guest editor Meghan, Duchess of Sussex to appear on the cover of the September 2019 issue of British Vogue; this made Cox the first openly transgender woman to appear on the cover of British Vogue. 
 Songs of Praise showed its first gay wedding, which was the wedding of Jamie Wallace and Ian McDowall at the Rutherglen United Reformed Church in Glasgow. Lucia Lucas became the first transgender singer to perform with the English National Opera in London.
 Gayming Magazine, an online LGBTQ video gaming magazine is launched.

2020s 
2020 
 UK MP Layla Moran revealed in an interview with PinkNews that she is pansexual; she is believed to be the first UK parliamentarian to come out as pansexual. 
 On 13 January same-sex marriage became legal in Northern Ireland. 
 In February, the first same-sex marriage took place in Northern Ireland. 
 Jan Morris, a notable transgender historian, author and journalist passed away. 
 The High Court of Justice ruled children under 16 are unlikely to be able to consent to hormone blocker treatment in the Bell v Tavistock case. This halted all referrals of under 18s from GID's for any form of treatment and any referrals to be made from 1 December 2020 had to go through court to be approved.
 Levi Davis comes out as bisexual, making him the first professional rugby union player to come out as bisexual while still playing.
2021 
 Adrian Hanstock was made the temporary Chief Constable of the British Transport Police, making him the first openly gay man to be chief of police of a British police force. 
 On the 23 June, the Bank of England released a new £50 banknote with Alan Turing, making the first banknote with an LGBT person on it. 
 Owen J Hurcum became the world's first non-binary mayor and Wales' youngest ever elected mayor of Bangor City Council in Gwynedd, Wales. 
 Queen Elizabeth II announces that a conversion therapy ban is to be brought forward to parliament in her 2021 Queen's Speech. 
 Blood donation laws changed to allow some men who have sex with men to donate.
 The UK census includes questions on gender identity and sexual orientation for the first time, meaning that data can be gathered on the numbers of LGBT people across the country. 
 In September, judges overturned the Bell v Tavistock ruling and once again allowed trans people under 16 to consent to receiving puberty blockers.
2022
 The UK government announced new proposals to pardon a wider group of people previously convicted of military or civilian crimes imposed on someone solely because of consensual same-sex sexual activity. The amendment would also allow those who have died prior to the amendment coming into force, and within a year after the change comes into force, to be posthumously pardoned.
 Blackpool F.C.'s forward Jake Daniels came out as gay, making him the first active professional footballer to come out as LGBT+.
Queer Britain, the UK's first dedicated museum of LGBTQ history and culture opens in Kings Cross, London.
 The Royal Mint celebrates 50 years of pride in the UK by releasing a commemorative 50p coin, marking the first time Britain’s LGBT+ community has been celebrated on a UK coin.
 The Gender Recognition Reform (Scotland) Bill is passed by the Scottish Parliament, awaiting royal assent. The bill amends the Gender Recognition Act 2004 of the Parliament of the United Kingdom, making it simpler for people to change their legal gender in Scotland.
2023
 The Government of the United Kingdom uses section 35 of the Scotland Act 1998 to block the reform bill from receiving royal assent, the first ever use of section 35.

See also 

 History of human sexuality
 LGBT history
 LGBT rights in the United Kingdom
 Stonewall (charity)
 History of violence against LGBT people in the United Kingdom
 Hall–Carpenter Archives the national archive of LGBT history
 Oscar Wilde
 Table of years in LGBT rights
 Timeline of sexual orientation and medicine

References

Further reading 
 David, Hugh. On queer street: a social history of British homosexuals.
 Houlbrook, Matt. Queer London: Perils and Pleasures in the Sexual Metropolis, 1918–1957.
 Hyde, Harford Montgomery. The Love that Dared Not Speak Its Name: A Candid History of Homosexuality in Britain.
 Jennings, Rebecca. A Lesbian History of Britain: Love and Sex Between Women Since 1500.
 Jennings, Rebecca. Tomboys and bachelor girls: A lesbian history of post-war Britain 1945–71.
 Williams, Clifford . Courage to Be: Organised Gay Youth in England 1967 – 1990.

External links 

 UK LGBT Archive's "Timeline of UK LGBT History"

British history timelines
United Kingdom